Marcel·lí Gausachs i Gausachs (1891–1931) was a Catalan photographer, from the northeast of Spain. Little is known of his life. He was a member of the photographic section of the Hiking Club of Catalonia. He specialised in stereoscopic photography, a technique in which two pictures are taken from slightly different positions; when looked at in a viewer which presents only one picture to each eye, this produces an illusion of 3D. His subject-matter was the architecture, landscape and human activity of Catalonia and Spain, and to a lesser extent of France and Belgium, in the early years of the 20th century.

Gallery

References

1891 births
Date of birth missing
Place of birth missing
1931 deaths
Date of death missing
Place of death missing
Photographers from Catalonia
Stereoscopic photography